The United States's Musketeer nuclear test series was a group of 14 nuclear tests conducted in 1986–1987. These tests  followed the Operation Charioteer series and preceded the Operation Touchstone series.

References

Explosions in 1986
Explosions in 1987
1986 in military history
1987 in military history
Musketeer